In chemistry, residue is whatever remains or acts as a contaminant after a given class of events.

Residue may be the material remaining after a process of preparation, separation, or purification, such as distillation, evaporation, or filtration. It may also denote the undesired by-products of a chemical reaction.

Food safety 
Toxic chemical residues, wastes or contamination from other processes, are a concern in food safety. For example, the U.S. Food and Drug Administration (FDA) and the Canadian Food Inspection Agency (CFIA) have guidelines for detecting chemical residues that are possibly dangerous to consume.

Characteristic units within a molecule
Residue may refer to an atom or a group of atoms that forms part of a molecule, such as a methyl group.

Biochemistry 

In biochemistry and molecular biology, a residue refers to a specific monomer within the polymeric chain of a polysaccharide, protein or nucleic acid. One might say, "This protein consists of 118 amino acid residues" or "The histidine residue is considered to be basic because it contains an imidazole ring." Note that a residue is different from a moiety,  which, in the above example would be constituted by the imidazole ring or the imidazole moiety.

The concept that suggested this term is presumably the nature of the condensation reaction by which such types of monomeric building blocks, such as amino acids or monosaccharides, are strung together to form a polymeric chain, such as a polysaccharide or a peptide; some atoms are discarded from each building block, leaving only a "residue" of each building block that ends up in the finished product. Typically the atoms discarded are an oxygen atom and two hydrogen atoms, in the form of a water molecule,  A residue might be one amino acid in a polypeptide or one monosaccharide in a starch molecule, for example.

References 

Distillation